The second annual MTV Romania Music Awards were held at Sala Polivalentă in Bucharest.

Winners
 Best Rock: IRIS//Uriah Heep
 Best DJ: Rhadoo
 Best Group: Class
 Best Male: Marius Moga
 Best Female: Andra
 Best Live: Voltaj
 Best website: www.annes.ro
 Best New Act: Unu VS. George Nicolescu
 Best Song: O-Zone
 Best Dance: O-Zone
 Best Hip-Hop: Paraziţii
 Best Pop: Class
 Best Album: Animal X
 Best Video: Zdob şi Zdub 
 Life Time Award: Phoenix
 Free Your Mind: "Litoralul pentru toţi" – Dan Matei Agathon

References

MTV Romania Music Awards
Romanian music awards
2003 in Romanian music